The Aist class (NATO-Code; Russian Project 12321 Dzheyran) was the first large assault hovercraft operated by the Soviet Navy. It was designed by the Almaz design bureau wing of the Almaz Shipbuilding Company in 1964–1965. Production of the craft lasted from 1970 until 1985 at Almaz's plant in Leningrad.

Configuration
The Aist class was built to roughly the same size as the British SR.N4 commercial channel ferry. The Russian name for this class is "maly desantny korabl na vozdushnoy podushke" meaning "small landing craft on air cushion". The Aist-class prototype was built in 1970, and the type entered production in Leningrad in 1975. It was produced there at a rate of about six every four years. By the early 1990s, twenty to twenty four had been produced.

The craft began to be withdrawn following the fall of the Soviet Union, and, by 2004, only six remained, in two levels of configuration. A modified main engine intake was installed on all Russian Navy Aists in service with the Baltic Sea Fleet. These intakes are believed to include special filters to reduce the ingestion of salt water, sand and dust particles into the Aists' engines and machinery, limiting the effects of salt water corrosion. The Aists have suffered from high cushion pressure, and they produce exceptionally heavy cushion spray, especially at low speeds.

Operations
Three modified Aists (700 series) are based in the Baltic Sea, and the other three are in the Caspian Sea. Craft #609 participated in the Caspian Sea exercise in 2002. The earlier engines have been upgraded to allow an increase in displacement up to 298 tons, which is up from the type's original 260 tons but at a loss of roughly half the type's original range. Some units carry two SA-N-5 quadruple SAM systems and chaff launchers.

Variations
In addition to the Baltic Sea upgrades, several variants have been built, and they differ externally in fin height, overall length, superstructure details and defensive armament. In an effort to reduce accidents, an Aist combat mission simulator was produced by the former Soviet Navy to improve the ability of Aist commanders to operate the craft on the sea and over beaches.

The Aists were upgraded during the 1990s to carry 80 tons of cargo.

Registry
 #609
 #610
 #615
 #700
 MDK 89 (formerly #730)
 MDK 113 (formerly #722)

See also
List of ships of the Soviet Navy
List of ships of Russia by project number

References
 Sharpe, Richard (RN), Jane's Fighting Ships 1990-91, 
 Air cushion small landing ships – Complete Ship List 

Amphibious warfare vessels of the Soviet Navy
Amphibious warfare vessels of the Russian Navy
Military hovercraft
Landing craft